Robert Langton may refer to:

Robert Langton (footballer)
Robert Langton (MP) for Newton (UK Parliament constituency)

See also

Robert Langdon (disambiguation)